London Fenchurch Street may refer to:

Fenchurch Street, London
Fenchurch Street railway station, London